Jamina Caroline Roberts (born 28 May 1990) is a Swedish handball player for Vipers Kristiansand and the Swedish national team.

She competed at the 2012, 2016 and 2020 Olympics. At the 2010 European Women's Handball Championship she reached the final and won a silver medal with the Swedish team.

Roberts was born to an Aruban father and a Swedish mother.

Achievements  
Swedish League Champion:
2009, 2010, 2011, 2012, 2013, 2014, 2022
EHF-Cup:
Winner: 2015
EHF Cup Winners' Cup:
Winner: 2016
Carpathian Trophy:
Winner: 2015
Norwegian Cup:
Winner: 2022/23

Individual awards
 All-Star Team as Best Left Back at the Olympics 2020
 Swedish Female Handballer of the Year 2022

References

External links

1990 births
Living people
Swedish female handball players
Handball players at the 2012 Summer Olympics
Handball players at the 2016 Summer Olympics
Swedish people of Aruban descent
Handball players from Gothenburg
Expatriate handball players
Swedish expatriate sportspeople in Denmark
Swedish expatriate sportspeople in Hungary
Swedish expatriate sportspeople in Norway
Swedish expatriates in Hungary
Olympic handball players of Sweden
IK Sävehof players
TTH Holstebro players
Handball players at the 2020 Summer Olympics
21st-century Swedish women